Kristen Michelle Weiss (born May 11, 1984) is an American former soccer player who played as a forward, making four appearances for the United States women's national team.

Career
Weiss played for the Walsh Jesuit Warriors in high school, where she was a two-time Parade High-School All-American and the NSCAA National Player of the Year in 2001. She helped the team to win two consecutive state championships as a junior and senior, and was twice the school's Female Athlete of the Year. She scored 138 goals and recorded 80 assists during her high school career, finishing as the top goalscorer in state history. She also played club soccer for Internationals Soccer Club. In college, she played for the Virginia from 2002 to 2006. She tore her ACL during her freshman year, ending the season prematurely, and another tear of the same ACL a year later forced her to miss the entire 2003 season, though she received a medical redshirt. She converted her penalty to help the team win the 2004 ACC Women's Soccer Tournament championship game, where she was subsequently named on the All-ACC Tournament Team. Her senior season was again cut short after a tear in her other ACL, forcing her to end her athletic career. In total, she scored 10 goals and recorded 10 assists in 45 appearances for the Cavaliers.

Weiss played for the under-16, under-17, and under-19 national teams. She made her international debut for the United States on March 7, 2001 in a friendly match against Italy. In total, she made four appearances for the U.S., earning her final cap on March 17, 2001 in the 2001 Algarve Cup against Norway.

From 2006 to 2008, Weiss worked as a women's soccer administrator at her alma mater Virginia. She later began coaching, working as an assistant for the Clemson Tigers from 2008 to 2010, the Maryland Terrapins from 2010 to 2012 as a volunteer, the Milwaukee Panthers in 2012, and the Wisconsin Badgers from 2013 to 2016. She holds a U.S. Soccer National "A" coaching license.

Personal life
Weiss was born in Fairview Park, Ohio, though she grew up in Brecksville, Ohio.

Career statistics

International

References

1984 births
Living people
People from Fairview Park, Ohio
Soccer players from Ohio
American women's soccer players
American women's soccer coaches
United States women's international soccer players
Women's association football forwards
Virginia Cavaliers women's soccer players
Clemson Tigers women's soccer coaches
Maryland Terrapins women's soccer coaches
Milwaukee Panthers coaches
Wisconsin Badgers women's soccer coaches